The 2011 European Youth Baseball Championship will be an under-16 international baseball competition held in Brno and Třebíč, Czech Republic from July 19 to 23, 2011. It will feature teams from Austria, Bulgaria, Czech Republic, Germany, Italy, Netherlands, Russia and Sweden.

Schedule and results

Group stage

Pool A

Schedule

Pool B

Schedule

Final round

Semi-finals

7th place

5th place

Final

Final standings

External links
Tournament Standings
Official Website Česká baseballová asociace

References

European Youth Baseball Championship
European Youth Baseball Championship
2011
2011 in Czech sport